Nadejda Colesnicenco (born 28 June 1996) is a Moldovan footballer who plays as a midfielder and has appeared for the Moldova women's national team.

Career
Colesnicenco has been capped for the Moldova national team, appearing for the team during the 2019 FIFA Women's World Cup qualifying cycle.

References

External links
 
 
 

1996 births
Living people
People from Bender, Moldova
Moldovan women's footballers
Women's association football midfielders
Moldova women's international footballers
Moldovan expatriate women's footballers
Moldovan expatriate sportspeople in Romania
Expatriate women's footballers in Romania